The 31st Army was a field army of the Red Army during the Second World War.

Formation
The army was formed on July 15, 1941 in the Moscow Military District.  It was ordered to create a defensive line along Ostashkov - Selizharovo - Rzhev.  The army was stationed between the 27th Army to the north and the 49th Army to the south.

31st Army was formed with the following units:
244th Rifle Division
246th Rifle Division
247th Rifle Division
249th Rifle Division

and on August 1, it was assigned to the Reserve Front, and added the following units: 
119th Rifle Division
110th Tank Division
43rd Corps Artillery Regiment
766th Antitank Artillery Regiment
537th Miner-Sapper Battalion

The army was assigned to the Reserve Front on July 30, 1941, and it moved to the defensive line along Ostashkov - Yeltsy - Tishina River. It entered combat on October 2, 1941.  At that time, the army was composed of:
5th Rifle Division
110th Rifle Division
119th Rifle Division
247th Rifle Division
249th Rifle Division
296th Machine-Gun Artillery Battalion
297th Machine-Gun Artillery Battalion
43rd Corps Artillery Regiment
336th Corps Artillery Regiment
766th Antitank Artillery Regiment
873rd Antitank Artillery Regiment
199th Naval Artillery Battalion
282nd Naval Gun Battery
537th Miner-Sapper Battalion

Combat operations

1941
The 31st Army engaged the Germans on October 2, 1941, during Operation Typhoon.  On October 6, it formed a task force under the command of Major General Polenov, and along with a task force from 19th Army under the command of Lieutenant General I. Boldin, was given the mission to break the enemy advance near Volokolamsk and Rzhev.  On October 7 the first snow fell, turning the roads into mud and forcing the 3rd Panzer Group's advance to a halt.  The snow allowed the army to set up defensive positions along the Zhuralyovo − Large Yakovtsevo − Ivashkova and create a corridor for retreating Soviet troops.  This began the Kalinin Defensive Operation phase of the Moscow Strategic Defensive operations.

On October 10, the 110th Tank Division was detached and ordered to Rzhev.

On October 19, the army was reduced to:
119th Rifle Division
183rd Rifle Division
46th Cavalry Division
54th Cavalry Division
8th Tank Brigade and
Motorized Rifle Brigade of the Kalinin Front

From October 19 to 22, the army fought against German forces, which had broken into the district of Mednoye. The army received reinforcements from the 113th and 252nd Rifle Divisions.  On October 22, the army was ordered to take the offensive in conjunction with the 29th and 30th Armies to liberate the city of Kalinin.  While unable to retake the city, the attack was able to draw off a number of German forces from the attack on Moscow.

On December 5 as part of the Moscow Strategic Offensive, the Kalinin Front began the Kalinin Offensive.  Encountering stubborn resistance and repeated counterattacks, the 29th and 31st Army had broken the flanks of the forces defending Kalinin by December 15, and on December 16, the 31st Army liberated the city.

On January 7, 1942, troops of the 39th, 29th, 31st and 30th armies were stopped on prepared defensive lines north of Rhzev near Lotoshino.

1942
From January 8 to April 20, the army participated in the Rzhev-Vyazma Strategic Offensive.  On April 20, the army moved into defensive positions east of Zubtsov, Russia.

On July 23, the army was assigned to the Western Front, and took part in the Rzhev-Sychevka offensive from July 30 to August 23, liberating the city of Zubstov on the 23rd of August.

From November 25 to December 20, 1942, the army participated in Operation Mars.

1943
On March 20, 1943, the army crossed the Dnieper River, despite the complications of the spring thaw breaking up the river's ice.  The army attempted to go on the offensive, but was unable to break through the German defenses, and by the end of the month the commander decided to discontinue the general offensive and join the defense.

Composition as of August 1, 1943:
36th Rifle Corps
215th Rifle Division
274th Rifle Division
359th Rifle Division
45th Rifle Corps
88th Rifle Division
220th Rifle Division
331st Rifle Division
71st Rifle Corps (Headquarters only)
82nd Rifle Division
133rd Rifle Division
251st Rifle Division
392nd Gun Artillery Regiment
542nd Gun Artillery Regiment
644th Gun Artillery Regiment
646th Gun Artillery Regiment
529th Tank Destroyer Regiment
873rd Tank Destroyer Regiment
549th Mortar Regiment
341st Antiaircraft Artillery Regiment
1269th Antiaircraft Artillery Regiment
1478th Antiaircraft Artillery Regiment
2nd Guard Motorcycle Regiment
72nd Engineer Battalion
291st Engineer Battalion

On August 7, the army went on the offensive as part of Operation Suvorov, part of the Smolensk Strategic Offensive.  The army made only limited penetrations of the German lines. After a beating of heavy German counterattacks, the attack was suspended on August 11.  After a regrouping of the forces, the attack resumed on August 16. However, the forces were unable to advance even a mile and the attack was again suspended on August 20.

The attack resumed on August 30 with little progress made.  That evening the Germans began to withdraw their forces.  The Soviet pursuit began on August 31 with the crossing of the Vopets River.  After a week of retreating, the Germans managed to establish a defensive line near Yartsevo and on September 7 took up defensive positions.

On September 15 they resumed the attack, crossing the Vop River. In conjunction with the 5th and 68th Armies, they liberated Smolensk on September 25.

1944
From February to March, the army participated in operations to liberate Brest.

At the opening of Operation Bagration, the army consisted of:
36th Rifle Corps
220th Rifle Division
352nd Rifle Division
71st Rifle Corps
88th Rifle Division
192nd Rifle Division
331st Rifle Division
113th Rifle Corps
62nd Rifle Division
174th Rifle Division
173rd Rifle Division
140th Gun Artillery Brigade
392nd Corps Gun Artillery Regiment
570th Corps Gun Artillery Regiment
83rd Guards Howitzer Artillery Regiment
43rd Antitank Artillery Brigade
529th Tank Destroyer Regiment
549th Mortar Regiment
74th Guards Mortar Regiment
2nd Separate Artillery Observation Balloon Battalion
66th Antiaircraft Artillery Division
1981st Antiaircraft Artillery Regiment 
1985th Antiaircraft Artillery Regiment
1989th Antiaircraft Artillery Regiment
1993rd Antiaircraft Artillery Regiment
1275th Antiaircraft Artillery Regiment
1478th Antiaircraft Artillery Regiment
1481st Antiaircraft Artillery Regiment
525th Antiaircraft Artillery Battalion
213th Tank Brigade
926th SU Regiment
927th SU Regiment
959th SU Regiment
1445th SU Regiment
52nd Armored Train Battalion
90th Pontoon-Bridge Battalion (8th Pontoon-Bridge Brigade)
14th Flamethrower Battalion
15th Flamethrower Battalion

Assigned to the 3rd Belorussian Front, the army Operation Bagration participated in the assault of German forces in the Minsk Offensive encirclement. In addition to the 31st Army, the 2nd Belorussian Front's 33rd, 49th and 50th Armies were given the task of containing the Germans within the encirclement, and defeating German forces in the surrounding area.

The elimination of the German forces escaping from the city took place in three phases:
 July 5–7 – Destruction and suppression of organized attempts to break out.  After the surrender of the city, the German forces broke up into several disorganized groups and attempted to escape the encirclement.
 July 8–9 – Destruction of groups which had taken refuge in the forests south-east of Minsk.
 July 10–13 – Soviet troops combed the woods, capturing any remaining small enemy groups.

By the end of the summer of 1944, the forces of the 3rd Belorussian Front and 31st Army had reached the border of East Prussia.

1945
The army took part in the East Prussian Strategic Offensive under the command of the 3rd Belorussian Front. The army was transferred to the 1st Ukrainian Front in order to participate in the Prague Offensive.

Composition at the end of World War II:
36th Rifle Corps
173rd Rifle Division
176th Rifle Division
352nd Rifle Division
44th Rifle Corps
62nd Rifle Division
174th Rifle Division
220th Rifle Division
71st Rifle Corps
54th Rifle Division
88th Rifle Division
331st Rifle Division
140th Gun Artillery Brigade
51st Guards Tank Destroyer Regiment
357th Guards Tank Destroyer Regiment
529th Tank Destroyer Regiment
549th Mortar Regiment
1478th Antiaircraft Artillery Regiment
926th SU Regiment
959th SU Regiment
31st Engineer-Sapper Brigade

The army was disbanded in September 1945.

Command Staff
Commanders
Major Genersl Vasilii Nikitich Dalmatov – (July 15 – October 13, 1941)
Major General V. A. Yushkevich – (October 17, 1941 – March 19, 1942)
Major General V. I. Vostrukhov – (March 19 – April 14, 1942)
Major General V. Polenov – (April 15, 1942 – February 27, 1943)
Major General V. Gluzdovsky – (February 27, 1943 – May 27, 1944)
Lieutenant General V. Glagolev – (May 27 – December 15, 1944)
Lieutenant General P. G. Shafranov – (December 15, 1944 – May 11, 1945)

See also
List of Soviet armies

References

Marchand, Jean-Luc. Order of Battle Soviet Army World War 2. The Nafziger Collection, 24 Volumes

031
Military units and formations established in 1941
Military units and formations disestablished in 1946